Hofflins is an unincorporated community in western Crawford County, in the U.S. state of Missouri. The community is adjacent to I-44 approximately three miles northeast of Cuba and Leasburg lies three miles to the east. The St. Louis and San Francisco Railroad line passes through the location.

History
A post office called Hofflin was established in 1903, and remained in operation until 1943. The community has the name of the original owner of the site.

References

Unincorporated communities in Crawford County, Missouri
Unincorporated communities in Missouri